"Bailando" ("Dancing" in Spanish) is a song by Belgian group Paradisio. It was released in 1996 as the lead single from their debut album, Paradisio. The song is produced by Patrick Samoy and Luc Rigaux (a.k.a. the Unity Mixers) and reached number-one in Italy, Denmark, Norway, Finland and Sweden. It peaked at number 2 in Belgium. In Sweden, it was the best selling single by being triple platinum. The song was a hit in most countries across Europe during the summer of 1997.

In 1998, it was covered by Dutch singer Loona. The single reached number-one in Germany and Switzerland.

Critical reception
In 2012, Porcys listed the song at number 53 in their ranking of "100 Singles 1990-1999", adding, "It turned out that "Bailando", this synonym of the brazen dance of the nineties, is basically an almost perfect configuration of the features and attributes that I intuitively look for in popular music: sensual sexuality, playful foolishness, innocent escapism, thrilling groove and tempting hooku."

Chart performance
"Bailando" was very successful on the charts in Europe, making it the biggest hit by the group. It reached number-one in Denmark, Finland, Italy, Norway and Sweden. Additionally, the single managed to climb into the Top 10 also in Belgium, France and Spain. In France, it sold more than 550,000 copies, reaching number 4. In the United Kingdom, it only reached number 149 on the UK Singles Chart, but on the Eurochart Hot 100, it went to number 11 in July 1997. "Bailando" was awarded with a 2× platinum record in Norway and a 3× platinum record in Sweden.

Music video
Two different music videos were made to accompany the song: a 1996 Belgian version and a 1997 international version. One was directed by Thierry Dory and filmed in Miami Beach.

Track listings

Charts

Weekly charts

Year-end charts

Certifications and sales

Loona version

The song was covered by the Dutch recording artist Loona. It was released in 1998 through Urban as the first single from her debut studio album Lunita. Loona's version uses a sample of Yazoo's hit "Don't Go".

Music video
The music video was directed by Wilfried Happel.

Track listings
"Bailando" (Energia-Mix short) – 3:33
"Bailando" (Energia-Mix extended version) – 5:29
"Bailando" (Besa Me-Mix extended version) – 4:54
"Noche Linda" – 3:57

Chart performance

Weekly charts

Year-end charts

Certifications

See also

List of number-one hits of 1997 (Denmark)
List of number-one singles of 1997 (Finland)
List of number-one hits (Italy)
List of number-one songs in Norway
List of number-one singles and albums in Sweden
List of number-one hits of 1998 (Germany)
List of number-one singles of the 1990s (Switzerland)

References

1996 songs
1996 debut singles
1998 singles
Paradisio songs
Loona (singer) songs
Number-one singles in Denmark
Number-one singles in Finland
Number-one singles in Germany
Number-one singles in Italy
Number-one singles in Norway
Number-one singles in Sweden
Number-one singles in Switzerland
Spanish-language songs
Songs about dancing